Akhta is a village in Sitamarhi district, Bihar, India. It is located in two neighbouring taluks (subdistricts of India) : Suppi and Bairgania.

References

Villages in Sitamarhi district